The 1970 Eisenhower Trophy took place 23 to 26 September at the Real Club de la Puerta de Hierro in Madrid, Spain. It was the seventh World Amateur Team Championship for the Eisenhower Trophy. The tournament was a 72-hole stroke play team event with 36 four-man teams. The best three scores for each round counted towards the team total.

The United States won the Eisenhower Trophy for the fourth time, finishing 12 strokes ahead of the silver medalists, New Zealand. South Africa took the bronze medal while Australia finished fourth. Victor Regalado from Mexico had the lowest individual score, eight-under-par 280, three strokes better than Dale Hayes from South Africa. Tom Kite was ill on the final day and didn't complete his final round.

Teams
36 four-man teams contested the event.

Scores

Source:

Individual leaders
There was no official recognition for the lowest individual scores.

Source:

References

External links
Record Book on International Golf Federation website 

Eisenhower Trophy
Golf tournaments in Spain
Eisenhower Trophy
Eisenhower Trophy
Eisenhower Trophy